Tysjöarna Nature Reserve is a nature reserve in Jämtland County in Sweden. It is part of the EU-wide Natura 2000-network, and has been designated as a Ramsar site since 2001.

The nature reserve is an important resting area for migrating birds. Three towers for birdwatching have been built in the area. Species that are known to be found in Tysjöarna Nature Reserve include whooper swan, common crane, tufted duck, common goldeneye, little gull, northern lapwing and common redshank.

References

External links
 Folder about the nature reserve

Nature reserves in Sweden
Natura 2000 in Sweden
Ramsar sites in Sweden
Tourist attractions in Jämtland County
Geography of Jämtland County
Protected areas established in 2013
2013 establishments in Sweden